Crow Boy is a 1955 picture book written and illustrated by Taro Yashima. The book tells the story of a shy Japanese boy named Chibi who hides at school until a new teacher takes notice of him. The book was a recipient of a 1956 Caldecott Honor for its illustrations and shared the 1955 Child Study Association (now affiliated with Bank Street College of Education) Children's Book Award (now called the Josette Frank Award) with Plain Girl by Virginia Sorensen. This book was translated into Japanese by Taro himself and published in Japan in 1979.

References

1955 children's books
American picture books
Caldecott Honor-winning works